Fracassi is an Italian surname. Notable people with this surname include:

 Cesare Fracassi (1838–1868), Italian painter
 Clemente Fracassi (1917–1993), Italian film producer, director and screenwriter
 Fabrizio Fracassi (born 1957), Italian politician

See also
 Fracassini

Italian-language surnames